Kennedy Energy Park is a wind, solar and storage hybrid power station approximately 20 km south east of Hughenden and 290 km southwest of Townsville in Queensland.

Stage one of the project is a “proof-of-concept” commenced construction 2018, consisting of 30 MW of wind turbines, 20 MW of single axis tracking Solar Panels, and 2 MW of Li ion battery storage, costing $120 million to build and expected to be operational in 2020. It was constructed in 2018 but did not start to connect to the grid until July 2021. It is intended that the combination of solar and wind generation will be complementary and lead to stable output.

Stage two is proposed to be capable of producing 1200 MW of renewable energy, costing $2 billion and was hoped to commence construction before the end of 2020.

See also

Wind power in Australia
Renewable energy in Australia
List of wind farms in Queensland

References

Wind farms in Queensland
Proposed wind farms in Australia
Proposed solar power stations in Australia
Solar power stations in Queensland